Gardangah-e Shahali (also Romanized as Gardangāh-e Shāh‘alī; also known as Shāh ‘Alī) is a village in Miyankuh-e Gharbi Rural District, in the Central District of Pol-e Dokhtar County, Lorestan Province, Iran. At the 2006 census, its population was 50, in 9 families.

References 

Towns and villages in Pol-e Dokhtar County